Antonio Menéndez (born 18 August 1946 in Cangas del Narcea) is a Spanish former professional cyclist.

Major results

1970
1st Stage 3 Setmana Catalana de Ciclisme
3rd Overall Vuelta a Asturias
1973
1st Stage 4 Volta a Catalunya
1974
1st GP Llodio
1st GP Vizcaya
1st Stage 3 Vuelta a Asturias
3rd National Road Race Championships
3rd Prueba Villafranca de Ordizia
1975
1st Tour of Corsica
1st Stage 11 Vuelta a España
2nd GP Llodio
1976
1st Stage 11 Giro d'Italia
1978
1st Stage 2 Vuelta a los Valles Mineros
2nd Prueba Villafranca de Ordizia
3rd National Road Race Championships

References

1946 births
Living people
Spanish male cyclists
People from Narcea
Cyclists from Asturias